A gas-cooled reactor (GCR) is a nuclear reactor that uses graphite as a neutron moderator and a gas (carbon dioxide or helium in extant designs) as coolant. Although there are many other types of reactor cooled by gas, the terms GCR and to a lesser extent gas cooled reactor are particularly used to refer to this type of reactor.

The GCR was able to use natural uranium as fuel, enabling the countries that developed them to fabricate their own fuel without relying on other countries for supplies of enriched uranium, which was at the time of their development in the 1950s only available from the United States or the Soviet Union. The Canadian CANDU reactor, using heavy water as a moderator, was designed with the same goal of using natural uranium fuel for similar reasons.

Design considerations
Historically thermal spectrum graphite moderated gas cooled reactors mostly competed with light water reactors, ultimately losing out to them after having seen some deployment in Britain and France. Heavy water reactors share some design considerations as both are capable in principle of using unenriched fuel but require online refueling to be viable power reactors.

Advantages
 No void coefficient of reactivity as the coolant is a gas at room temperature and remains gaseous at operating temperature
 Able to use natural (unenriched) uranium as carbon has a lower neutron absorption cross section than light water
 High coolant outlet temperature can be achieved, increasing Carnot efficiency
 Lower pressure than in a Pressurized water reactor
 Magnox reactors were designed to be dual use producing both power and weapons grade plutonium later designs instead bred reactor grade plutonium
 Lower danger of hydrogen explosion as no water is present
 High coolant outlet temperature allows better use for process heat if desired
 Adding normal (light) water - e.g. as emergency coolant - scrams the reaction allowing better safety in dealing with unforeseen accidents

Disadvantages
 Bulky due to lower energy density of natural uranium compared to enriched fuel and lower moderating effect of carbon compared to water
 Magnox fuel cladding cannot be stored for long times in a spent fuel pool making nuclear reprocessing mandatory
 Boudouard reaction between graphite moderator and CO2 coolant can produce explosive and poisonous carbon monoxide
 A loss of coolant accident, unlike in a water moderated reactor, does not by itself cause a scram
 Graphite is flammable and is exposed to high temperatures in operation - a graphite fire is a possible accident scenario
 nuclear graphite is more expensive than light water but less expensive than heavy water

Generation I GCR
There were two main types of generation I GCR:

 The Magnox reactors developed by the United Kingdom.
 The UNGG reactors developed by France.

The main difference between these two types is in the fuel cladding material. Both types were mainly constructed in their countries of origin, with a few export sales: two Magnox plants to Italy and Japan, and one UNGG to Spain. More recently, GCRs based on the declassified drawings of the early Magnox reactors have been constructed by North Korea at the Yongbyon Nuclear Scientific Research Center.

Both types used fuel cladding materials that were unsuitable for medium term storage under water, making reprocessing an essential part of the nuclear fuel cycle. Both types were, in their countries of origin, also designed and used to produce weapons-grade plutonium, but at the cost of major interruption to their use for power generation despite the provision of online refuelling.

Generation II GCR 
In the UK, the Magnox was replaced by the advanced gas-cooled reactor (AGR), an improved Generation II gas cooled reactor. In France, the UNGG was replaced by the pressurized water reactor (PWR).

Types
Gas-cooled reactor types include:

 Gas-cooled reactor (graphite moderated, CO2 cooled)
 Magnox (British design, 28 built, 1956-2015)
 UNGG reactor (French design, 10 built, 1956-1994)
 Advanced Gas-cooled Reactor (Magnox successor, 15 built, 1962-today)
 Heavy water gas cooled reactor (heavy water moderated, CO2 cooled)
 Brennilis Nuclear Power Plant (1967-1985)
 KS 150 (1972-1979)
 High & Very-high temperature reactor (graphite moderated, Helium cooled)
 Prismatic block reactor
 Dragon reactor (1964-1975)
 Peach Bottom Atomic Power Station (1967-1974)
 Fort Saint Vrain Generating Station (1979-1989)
 High-temperature engineering test reactor (1999-today)
 Gas Turbine Modular Helium Reactor (General Atomics design)
 Steam Cycle High-Temperature Gas-Cooled Reactor (Areva SMR design)
 Pebble bed reactor
 AVR reactor (1966-1988)
 THTR-300 (1983-1989)
 HTR-10 (2003-today)
 HTR-PM (under construction)
 Pebble bed modular reactor (design)
 Gas-cooled fast reactor (No moderator, Helium cooled)
 Energy Multiplier Module (General Atomics design)

See also
 UHTREX

Graphite moderated reactors
Nuclear power reactor types